Dajç is a village and a former municipality in the Shkodër County, northwestern Albania. At the 2015 local government reform it became a subdivision of the municipality Shkodër. The population at the 2011 census was 3,885.

Settlements 
There are 11 settlements within Dajç.

 Dajç
 Darragjat
 Belaj
 Mali i Gjymtit
 Mushan
 Pentar
 Rrushkull
 Samrisht i Ri
 Samrisht i Sipërm
 Sukë Dajç
 Shirq

References 

 
Administrative units of Shkodër
Former municipalities in Shkodër County
Villages in Shkodër County